The 1996–97 Hellenic Football League season was the 44th in the history of the Hellenic Football League, a football competition in England.

Premier Division

The Premier Division featured 17 clubs which competed in the division last season, along with one new club:
Wantage Town, promoted from Division One

League table

Division One

Division One featured 16 clubs which competed in the division last season, along with one new club:
Ross Town

League table

References

External links
 Hellenic Football League

1996-97
8